Doug Lawrence (born October 11, 1956) is an American jazz tenor saxophonist from Lake Charles, Louisiana.

Early life
Lawrence was born into a musical family in Lake Charles, Louisiana, and raised in Albuquerque, New Mexico. His father and two brothers were professional musicians and both of his sisters also played. His mother was a dancer. Lawrence studied music at the University of New Mexico and was a member of the Jazz Knights, a jazz ensemble of the West Point Band.

Career 
Lawrence spent over 20 years in New York City, collaborating with Tony Bennett, Aretha Franklin, Roy Eldridge and others. He has also recorded with many prominent jazz musicians such as Buck Clayton, Dizzy Gillespie, Ray Charles, Wild Bill Davis, Hank Jones, Mel Lewis, and Jimmy Cobb as well as recording six albums as a leader including - "Soul Carnival", "High Heel Sneakers", "Big Band Swing" and "Street Wise". Lawrence served in the West Point Band's Jazz Knights in the early 1980s as the lead tenor saxophonist.

Lawrence has been a featured performer at Carnegie Hall, the Kennedy Center, the Village Vanguard, the Walt Disney Concert Hall and at international concert halls and jazz festivals including the Sydney Opera House, the Moscow International House of Music, the Blue Note Tokyo, Telluride Jazz Celebration and the North Sea Jazz Festival. Lawrence is currently the featured tenor soloist with the Count Basie Orchestra and also works with the organist Joey DeFrancesco, pianist George Cables and drummer Louis Hayes among others and leads his own band called the Doug Lawrence Organic Trio or Quartet. Lawrence frequently appears as guest clinician and artist-in-residence at universities and jazz camps around the world.

Personal life 
Lawrence and his live in New Mexico.

Discography

As leader
 Soul Carnival (Fable 1997)
 High Heel Sneakers (Fable/Lightyear 1998)
 Big Band Swing (Black Orchid 2001)
 Street Wise (AllTribe 2002)
 Doug Lawrence New Organ Trio (Cactus 2014)
 Doug Lawrence and Friends (Junkie Jazz 2021)

As sideman
 Richard Allen, Gone with the Wind (JazzInn 1999)
 Count Basie Orchestra, All About That Basie (Concord 2018)
 Count Basie Orchestra, A Very Swinging Basie Christmas (Concord 2015)
 Count Basie Orchestra, Ella 100: Live At The Apollo (Concord 2020)
 Count Basie Orchestra, Live At Birdland (Candid 2021)
 Count Basie Orchestra, Live in Japan (Sony 2006)
 Count Basie Orchestra, Singing, Swinging, Playing (Mack Avenue 2009)
 Hinton Battle, Meets the Count Basie Orchestra (Sony 2013)
 Tony Bennett, A Swingin' Christmas (Columbia 2008)
 Ray Charles, Ray Sings, Basie Swings (Concord 2007)
 Buck Clayton, A Swingin' Dream (Stash 1989)
 Buck Clayton, Live at the Village Vangauuard (Nagel Hayer 1991)
 Rosemary Clooney, Live At Ravinia (PBS/WTTW 2001)
 Tony Corbiscello, In Full Swing (Allanna 1999)
 Jamie Cullum, The Pursuit (Verve 2009)
 Wild Bill Davis Trio, Live At The West End (WKCR 1990)
 Nneenna Freelon, Blueprint of a Lady (Concord 2005)
 Jeff Jeroloman and George Cables, Swing Thing (Candid 1993)
 George V. Johnson, Live at the JazzInn (JazzInn 2001)
 Martha Lorin, The Time Is Now (Carmel 1993)
 Butch Miles, Straight On Till Morning (Nagel Hayer 2003)
 Grover Mitchell, Truckin (Stash 1987)
 Grover Mitchell, Hip Shakin (Ken 1990)
 Grover Mitchell, Live In Paris (Radio France 1987)
 New York Voices, Sing, Sing, Sing (Concord 2000)
 Ken Peplowski, A Good Reed (Concord 1997)
 Sammy Price, Two Tenor Boogie featuring Percy France and Doug Lawrence (WKCR 1990)
 Loren Schoenberg, Just a Sittin' and a Rockin''' (Musicmasters 1990)
 Loren Schoenberg, Manhattan Work Song (Music Masters 1993)
 Loren Schoenberg, Out of This World (Montreux 1998)
 Loren Schoenberg, Time Waits for No One (Music Masters 1992)
 Cynthia Scott, I Just Want to Know (Itocs 1998)
 Bobby Short, You're the Top (Telarc 1999)
 Clyde Stubblefield, B3 Bombers Live at the Green Mill (AllTribe 2002)
 Teri Thornton, Good Morning Heartache (Monte Carlo 1988)
 John Trentacosta, Meets Doug Lawrence, Desert Bop'' (Cactus 2019)

References

External links
 Doug Lawrence official website
 Count Basie website, Richard Barnhart
 Jimmy Cobb website
 Doug Lawrence Interview NAMM Oral History Library (2022)

1956 births
Living people
American jazz tenor saxophonists
American male saxophonists
Hard bop saxophonists
Swing saxophonists
Musicians from Lake Charles, Louisiana
United States Military Academy people
United States Army Band musicians
21st-century American saxophonists
Jazz musicians from Louisiana
21st-century American male musicians
American male jazz musicians
People from Albuquerque, New Mexico
Musicians from Albuquerque, New Mexico
Musicians from New Mexico
Jazz musicians from New Mexico